Alexandra Bradshaw, also known as Alexandra Bradshaw Hoag (April 20, 1888 – September 23, 1981), was a Canadian-American watercolor artist and art professor. She studied art in the United States and Paris and became an instructor and head of the Fine Arts department at Fresno State College in California. Her works were exhibited in group and solo exhibitions throughout California and the United States from the 1930s through the 1960s. She married late in life to Clarence Hoag, the founder of Hoag Press in Boston. Their residence in Wakefield, Massachusetts, was Castle Clare and Bradshaw kept her house in South Laguna, California.

Biography
Alexandra Christine Bradshaw was born in Nova Scotia. Bradshaw was a senior class member in the General Professional Course at the California State Normal School in 1907 and 1908. A member of the midwinter class, she received her degree in January 1908. In 1914, she took an advanced art course at the California State Normal School in Los Angeles. She studied at with Andre L'Hote at Stanford University, with Rex Slinkard at University of California, Los Angeles, and Andre L'Hote again at Columbia University and Paris. She also studied with Hans Hofman.

Bradshaw taught at the California Normal School in Fresno by 1917. She was made Director of the Fine Arts Department at Fresno State College in 1920, a position she held until 1948. Two of her students that were particularly influenced by her were Don David and Hubert Buel.

The Laguna Beach South Coast News reported on August 30, 1940, that Bradshaw donated a watercolor entitled Fishing at Three Arch Bay to the British Red Cross Relief at a luncheon event held at her home the previous Sunday.  The painting was purchased by Mrs. C. Charles Clark of Laguna Beach.

From the time when Bradshaw was Fresno State College Fine Arts department head, she had a summer house at Three Arch Bay in South Laguna, California. Bradshaw married Clarence Hoag by 1954. Hoag was born in Nova Scotia in 1880 and founded Hoag Press in Boston, Massachusetts. Clarence and Alexandra lived outside of Boston, Massachusetts, in Wakefield in Castle Clare, that Clarence built between 1922 and 1949. It was divided into apartments after Clarence's death. The castle burned in 1974. Bradshaw also kept a summer house at Three Arch Bay in South Laguna, California. In 1966, the Hoags were on the California Register Blue Book.

On September 23, 1981, Bradshaw died in Whittier, California. Her works are featured at the California Regionalist Art Collectors Club in Newport Beach.

Membership
Bradshaw was a member of the Boston Society of Watercolor Painters, Cambridge Art Association, Laguna Beach Art Association, Pacific Art Association, San Francisco Women Artists, Fresno Art Association, and California Watercolor Society.

Exhibitions
Her were work was exhibited at:
 San Francisco Society of Women Painters, 1932 (award)
 Golden Gate International Exposition, 1939
 National Association of Women Artists, 1940, 1941
 California Water Color Society 1940, 1942, 1944, 1952–53
 Laguna Beach Art Association, 1941–48, (prizes), 1944, 1948 (prize)
 San Francisco Art Association, 1943, 1944
 San Francisco Museum of Art, 1943
 Riverside Museum, 1944, 1946
 Pasadena Art Institute (solo), 1959-1965
 Lucius Beebe Memorial Library, Wakefield MA, 1960, 1964 
 Laguna Beach CA, 1964
 Crocker Art Gallery (solo)
 Museum of Fine Arts, Boston
 Busch–Reisinger Museum
 San Diego Gallery Fine Arts (solo)
 City of Paris, San Francisco
 Little Gallery, Boston

References

Further reading

External links

1888 births
1981 deaths
Canadian women painters
American women painters
Canadian watercolourists
American watercolorists
Artists from Nova Scotia
Stanford University alumni
University of California, Los Angeles alumni
Columbia University alumni
California State University, Fresno faculty
Canadian emigrants to the United States
Painters from California
20th-century American painters
20th-century Canadian women artists
Women watercolorists
20th-century American women artists